Mawhun may refer to several places in Burma:

Mawhun, Ann
Mawhun, Mohnyin